Sarah Viren is an American essayist best known for her 2018 essay collection Mine.

Career
In 2016, Viren won the Riverteeth Book Prize which offered publication of her essay collection Mine.

Mine was published in 2018 and was longlisted at the 31st Annual Lammy Finalists in the Lesbian Memoir/Biography category and longlisted for the 2018 PEN/Diamonstein-Spielvogel Award for the Art of the Essay.

In 2020, The New York Times published a personal essay by Viren in which she revealed that she and her wife, Marta, both academics, were targeted with false accusations that they had sexually assaulted former students, accusations perpetuated by an unnamed academic whose harassment was based on professional jealousy. The essay was also featured on an episode of The New York Times''' popular podcast The Daily. It was a finalist for a National Magazine Award in feature writing in 2021.

Viren works as an assistant professor of creative nonfiction at Arizona State University. She's a contributing writing for the New York Times Magazine''.

Personal life
Viren is married to fellow academic Marta Tecedor.

References

American essayists
American women academics
Year of birth missing (living people)
American women essayists
Arizona State University faculty
Living people
21st-century American women